Endotricha cruenta is a species of snout moth in the genus Endotricha. It was described by Paul Ernest Sutton Whalley in 1963, and is known from New Guinea.

References

Endotrichini
Moths described in 1963